Birkeland may refer to:

Places
Birkeland, Agder, the administrative centre of Birkenes municipality in Agder county, Norway
Birkeland Church, a church in the city of Bergen in Vestland county, Norway
Birkeland, Vestland, a village in Austevoll municipality in Vestland county, Norway
Birkeland, another name for Tingvatn, the administrative centre of Hægebostad municipality in Agder county, Norway

People
Bjarte Birkeland, a Norwegian literary researcher
Eva Birkeland, a Norwegian civil servant
Halvor Birkeland, a Norwegian sailor
Kristian Birkeland, Norwegian Explorer and auroral scientist, after which is named:
Birkeland current, an electric current found in the aurora and space plasmas
Birkeland (lunar crater), a lunar impact crater in the southern hemisphere on the far side of the Moon
Omund Bjørnsen Birkeland, a Norwegian farmer and politician
Peter Hersleb Graah Birkeland, a Norwegian bishop
Rasmus Birkeland, a Norwegian sailor 
Reidar Birkeland, a Norwegian veterinarian
Thøger Birkeland, a Danish teacher and writer
Turid Birkeland, a Norwegian politician